Shane Lewis (born August 8, 1967) is an American racing driver who has competed primarily in sports car racing. He also competes in off-road racing and short course SXS racing.

Career
Shane Lewis's motorsport career began in 1989 in Southern California.  At the end of the year, he won the 20th edition of the United States Formula Ford Festival.

From 1991 onwards, he started regularly in SCCA and IMSA races. In 1995 he won the IMSA supercar races at Mid-Ohio and Phoenix.

In the 1996 SCCA Pro Racing World Challenge, he finished second in the championship behind Almo Coppelli. In 1997, he began competing in the IMSA GT Championship in the GT1 class. Soon after, he began participating in both Grand-Am Road Racing and American Le Mans Series events. Lewis drove extensively in the Rolex Sports Car Series for the Southard Motorsports Daytona Prototype team, while in American Le Mans he drove for a variety of teams, mostly in GT classes. He secured a total of three race victories between the two series, including the 2013 24 Hours of Daytona in the GX class. 

Lewis has also raced in European events, including three editions of the 24 Hours of Le Mans and five of the 24 Hours of the Nürburgring. He has taken victory in class in the 2010 24 Hours of the Nürburgring and the 2013 [[24 Hours of Dubai and the 24 hours of Daytona. 

Lewis has made brief forays into other disciplines of racing, including an attempted NASCAR start in 2002 at Watkins Glen International, an ARCA start in 2001 at Atlanta Motor Speedway, and an Indy Pro series start in 2007 at Homestead-Miami Speedway

Lewis competed and won in the Trans-Am series, where he drove for Robinson Racing. 

He currently races in the Creventic 24 hour series and the Nürburgring NLS.

Racing Results

24 Hours of Le Mans results

Complete WeatherTech SportsCar Championship results
(key)(Races in bold indicate pole position, Results are overall/class)

24 Hours of Daytona results

NASCAR
(key) (Bold – Pole position awarded by qualifying time. Italics – Pole position earned by points standings or practice time. * – Most laps led.)

Winston Cup Series

External links
Official website & biography

Racing results

Driver Database

1967 births
People from Lancaster, California
Living people
Racing drivers from California
24 Hours of Daytona drivers
24 Hours of Le Mans drivers
Rolex Sports Car Series drivers
American Le Mans Series drivers
NASCAR drivers
Trans-Am Series drivers
WeatherTech SportsCar Championship drivers
ARCA Menards Series drivers
24H Series drivers
Nürburgring 24 Hours drivers
Michelin Pilot Challenge drivers